Same-sex marriage in Idaho has been legally recognized since October 15, 2014. In May 2014, the U.S. District Court for the District of Idaho in the case of Latta v. Otter found Idaho's statutory and state constitutional bans on same-sex marriage unconstitutional, but enforcement of that ruling was stayed pending appeal. The Ninth Circuit Court of Appeals affirmed that ruling on October 7, 2014, though the U.S. Supreme Court issued a stay of the ruling, which was not lifted until October 15, 2014.

Opinion polls have shown that a majority or plurality of Idaho residents support same-sex marriage.

Legal history

Statutes
After the Hawaii Supreme Court seemed poised to legalize same-sex marriage in Hawaii in Baehr v. Miike in 1993, the Idaho Legislature amended its marriage statutes in 1995 to specifically specify that a marriage was to be between a man and a woman. The changes took effect on January 1, 1996. Fearing it would have to recognize same-sex marriages conducted in Hawaii, Idaho further amended its marriage laws to prohibit recognition of out-of-state same-sex marriages in 1996. Governor Phil Batt signed the legislation, which took immediate effect on March 18, 1996.

Constitutional amendment
On February 11, 2004, the Idaho House of Representatives, by a 53 to 17 vote, approved a constitutional amendment banning same-sex marriage and its "legal equivalent" in the state. The Idaho State Senate failed to vote on the amendment. On February 2, 2005, the Senate, by a 21–14 vote, failed to approve a similar constitutional amendment banning same-sex marriage and any "legal status similar to that of marriage". On February 6, 2006, the House of Representatives, by a 53 to 17 vote, approved Amendment 2, a constitutional amendment banning same-sex marriage and any "domestic legal union" in the state. The Senate approved the constitutional amendment on February 15 by a 26–9 vote, and it was approved by voters on November 7, 2006.

The amendment was found to be unconstitutional on May 13, 2014 by a federal district court. The ruling was affirmed by the Ninth Circuit Court of Appeals on October 7, 2014 and went into effect on October 15, 2014.

Federal lawsuit

Four Idaho lesbian couples filed a lawsuit in U.S. district court in November 2013, challenging the state's ban on same-sex marriage. On May 13, 2014, U.S. Chief Magistrate Candy W. Dale ruled in Latta v. Otter that Idaho's constitutional and statutory prohibitions against same-sex marriage were unconstitutional under the Fourteenth Amendment. She wrote:

The state appealed the ruling, and on May 20 the Ninth Circuit Court of Appeals stayed enforcement of Dale's ruling pending the outcome of that appeal and ordered the case heard on an expedited basis. On October 7, 2014, the Ninth Circuit Court of Appeals affirmed that the state's same-sex marriage ban was unconstitutional, finding that the ban violated the Fourteenth Amendment's right to equal protection. Idaho's county clerks prepared to process marriage licenses for same-sex couples the following day, October 8, until Supreme Court Justice Anthony Kennedy, in response to a petition from state officials, granted an emergency stay of the Ninth Circuit's implementation of its decision. Don Moline and Clint Newlan were able to obtain a marriage license in Twin Falls before Justice Kennedy issued the temporary stay. On October 10, 2014, Justice Kennedy, after consulting with the other members of the U.S. Supreme Court, denied the request for a stay and vacated the temporary stay. Latah County issued six marriage licenses to same-sex couples on October 10. That same day, the Latta plaintiffs asked the Ninth Circuit to lift the stay of the district court's order that it had imposed on May 20. The Ninth Circuit gave the parties until October 13 to reply. On October 13, the Ninth Circuit lifted its stay of the district court's order enjoining Idaho officials from enforcing the state's ban on same-sex marriage. The court's lifting of the stay went into effect on October 15, 2014. Rachael and Amber Beierle, plaintiffs in Latta, were the first couple to obtain a marriage license at the Ada County Clerk's Office on October 15. Maryanne Jordan, the president of the Boise City Council, officiated at the marriage, and said "It's been such a long time coming." More than 50 marriage licenses were issued to same-sex couples that Friday, October 15 in at least 9 of Idaho's counties: Ada, Bannock, Blaine, Bonner, Canyon, Custer, Kootenai, Latah, and Twin Falls.

On October 10, Governor Butch Otter announced that he would no longer contest the ruling in Latta and state agencies would comply when the Ninth Circuit requires Idaho to provide marriage rights to same-sex couples. On October 14, he announced that his office planned to continue defending the state's ban on same-sex marriage. On October 21, he filed a petition for an en banc rehearing by the Ninth Circuit. The plaintiffs filed a response to the petition opposing an en banc rehearing on November 10, 2014. The Ninth Circuit denied the request for rehearing en banc on January 9, 2015.

Developments after legalization
A tax conformity bill, which would allow Idaho taxpayers to use federal adjusted gross income on their federal return as a starting point in filling out their Idaho tax form, was opposed by a group of Republican lawmakers in February 2022 who argued that the bill circumvented the Idaho Constitution by approving same-sex marriage. Representative Ron Nate said, "The problem with this is that [the bill] does not protect our constitution in Idaho as it was amended in 2006", as the federal government uses its definition of marriage to allow adjustments. Representative Gregory Chaney disagreed, "Not only are you [Representative Nate] not doing a better job of upholding the Idaho Constitution, you are doing an absolutely miserable job of upholding the United States Constitution. This is another example of where we'd get our rear end kicked, summarily, and then we'd pay the attorney['s] fees for whoever sued us." The bill passed 46–22 in the House.

In January 2023, Senator Scott Herndon introduced legislation to eliminate marriage licenses and instead direct officiants to issue marriage certificates following a ceremony between "two qualified people, a man and a woman". Representative Ilana Rubel said the bill appears to codify that "there would only be marriage recognized between a man and a woman" in Idaho, which would violate the U.S. Constitution. The bill was scheduled to be heard in the Senate Judiciary and Rules Committee on January 23, but was dropped from the agenda just hours before the committee's meeting for unknown reasons.

Native American nations
Same-sex marriage is not recognized on the reservation of the Nez Perce Tribe of Idaho. Its Tribal Code states that "'marriage' means the civil status, condition or relation of a man and woman considered united in law as husband and wife". The Law and Order Code of the Shoshone-Bannock Tribes states that "'marriage is a personal relation arising out of a civil contract, to which the consent of parties capable of making it is necessary", but generally refers to married spouses as "husband and wife". However, the code states that marriages entered into outside the tribe's jurisdiction are valid if they are valid in the jurisdiction where they were entered into.

Many Native American tribes have traditions of two-spirit individuals who were born male but wore women's clothing and performed everyday household work and artistic handiwork which were regarded as belonging to the feminine sphere. This two-spirit status allowed for marriages between two biological males or two biological females to be performed among some of these tribes. Some of them married men, others married women, while others remained unmarried. It was considered inappropriate, however, for two  to form a relationship. The Nez Perce call them . They had sexual intercourse with cisgender men, but it is unclear if they were allowed to marry men. Verne F. Ray reported in 1932 that he had met a Coeur d'Alene st̓ámya who was intersex and remained unmarried. One famous Kutenai two-spirit person was Kaúxuma Núpika, who, after leaving his White fur trader husband, returned to his people and adopted men's clothing and weapons, and took a wife. Kaúxuma was one of the "principal leaders" of the tribe and supernatural powers were attributed to him. He "is remembered among the Kutenai as a respected shamanic healer", a masculine occupation.

Demographics and marriage statistics
Data from the 2000 U.S. census showed that 1,873 same-sex couples were living in Idaho. By 2005, this had increased to 2,096 couples, likely attributed to same-sex couples' growing willingness to disclose their partnerships on government surveys. Same-sex couples lived in all counties of the state, except Oneida, and constituted 0.6% of coupled households and 0.4% of all households in the state. Most couples lived in Ada, Canyon and Kootenai counties, but the counties with the highest percentage of same-sex couples were Lewis (0.90% of all county households) and Adams (0.77%). Same-sex partners in Idaho were on average younger than opposite-sex partners, and significantly more likely to be employed. However, the average and median household incomes of same-sex couples were lower than different-sex couples, and same-sex couples were also far less likely to own a home than opposite-sex partners. 16% of same-sex couples in Idaho were raising children under the age of 18, with an estimated 417 children living in households headed by same-sex couples in 2005.

98 and 115 same-sex marriages were performed in Ada County in 2020 and 2021, respectively. 110 same-sex couples were married in the first 10 months of 2022 in the same county.

Public opinion
A 2022 poll by the Idaho Statesman/SurveyUSA found that 49% of Idaho voters believed  same-sex marriage should remain legal if the Supreme Court overturned Obergefell, while 37% opposed, and 14% were unsure. Support was highest among Democrats (78%) and independents (62%), but lowest among Republicans (34%).

{| class="wikitable"
|+style="font-size:100%" | Public opinion for same-sex marriage in Idaho
|-
! style="width:190px;"| Poll source
! style="width:200px;"| Date(s)administered
! class=small | Samplesize
! Margin oferror
! style="width:100px;"| % support
! style="width:100px;"| % opposition
! style="width:40px;"| % no opinion
|-
| Idaho Statesman/Survey USA
| align=center| October 17–20, 2022
| align=center| 550 adults
| align=center| ?
|  align=center| 49%
| align=center| 37%
| align=center| 14%
|-
| Public Religion Research Institute
| align=center| March 8–November 9, 2021
| align=center| ?
| align=center| ?
|  align=center| 62%
| align=center| 34%
| align=center| 4%
|-
| Public Religion Research Institute
| align=center| January 7–December 20, 2020
| align=center| 349 random telephoneinterviewees
| align=center| ?
|  align=center| 48%
| align=center| 40%
| align=center| 12%
|-
| Public Religion Research Institute
| align=center| April 5–December 23, 2017
| align=center| 461 random telephoneinterviewees
| align=center| ?
|  align=center| 56%
| align=center| 32%
| align=center| 12%
|-
| Public Religion Research Institute
| align=center| May 18, 2016–January 10, 2017
| align=center| 609 random telephoneinterviewees
| align=center| ?
|  align=center| 54%
| align=center| 36%
| align=center| 9%
|-
| Public Religion Research Institute
| align=center| April 29, 2015–January 7, 2016
| align=center| 471 random telephoneinterviewees
| align=center| ?
|  align=center| 49%
| align=center| 41%
| align=center| 10%
|-
| Public Policy Polling
| align=center| October 9–12, 2014
| align=center| 522 likely voters
| align=center| ± 4.3%
| align=center| 38%
|  align=center| 57%
| align=center| 5%
|-
| New York Times/CBS News/YouGov
| align=center| September 20–October 1, 2014
| align=center| 594 likely voters
| align=center| ± 4.7%
| align=center| 33%
|  align=center| 51%
| align=center| 16%
|-
| Public Religion Research Institute
| align=center| April 2, 2014–January 4, 2015
| align=center| 309
| align=center| ?
|  align=center| 53%
| align=center| 41%
| align=center| 6%
|-

See also
LGBT rights in Idaho
Same-sex marriage in the United States

References

External links
 Latta v. Otter, United States District Court for the District of Idaho, May 13, 2014

2014 in LGBT history
LGBT rights in Idaho
Idaho
2014 in Idaho